{{Infobox graphic novel|   
title= Gaston Lagaffe #14  La saga des gaffes
|englishtitle=
|foreigntitle= 
|image= Gaston 14.JPG
|caption=Cover of the Belgian edition
|publisher=Dupuis
|date=1982
|series=Gaston Lagaffe  
|origlanguage=French
|origpublication=Spirou
|origissues= 
|origdate= 1980 - 1982
|origisbn= 2-8001-0955-6 
|transtitle=
|transpublisher=
|transdate=
|transseriestitle= 
|transisbn= 
|translator=
|writers=Franquin 
|artists=Franquin
|colorists=
|previssue= Lagaffe mérite des baffes, 1979
|nextissue= Gaffe à Lagaffe !, 1996
}}La saga des gaffes, written and drawn by Franquin, is the fifteenth album of the original Gaston Lagaffe'' series. It is made up of 44 strips previously published in Spirou.

Story
Most of the running gags feature Longtarin and Lagaffe, engaged in an intense struggle.

Background
This is the last album of the original Gaston Lagaffe series which is entirely composed of new comics strips.

References

 Gaston Lagaffe classic series on the official website
 Publication in Spirou on bdoubliées.com.

External links
Official website 

1982 graphic novels
Comics by André Franquin